"I Ain't Living Long Like This" is a song written by Rodney Crowell that was first recorded by Gary Stewart on his 1977 album Your Place or Mine (with Rodney Crowell and Nicolette Larson on backing vocals). Emmylou Harris then recorded the song  for her 1978 album, Quarter Moon in a Ten Cent Town.  Crowell released his version as well in 1978 on his debut album Ain't Living Long Like This.

Waylon Jennings version

In 1979,  Waylon Jennings recorded the song for his album What Goes Around Comes Around.  His version was his eleventh number one on the country chart. It is included on the Grand Theft Auto V soundtrack and played on the in-game radio station Rebel Radio hosted by Jesco White.

Chart performance

Year-end charts

Other recordings
Brooks & Dunn
Jerry Jeff Walker
Andy Griggs
Justin Moore
Webb Wilder
Albert Lee
Chris Janson
Foghat
The Dream Syndicate
Viagra Boys
Session Americana
Shannon McNally

References

1978 songs
1979 singles
Songs written by Rodney Crowell
Emmylou Harris songs
Rodney Crowell songs
Waylon Jennings songs
Andy Griggs songs
RCA Records Nashville singles